USS Sorrel was a small 68-ton steamer purchased by the Union Navy towards the end  of the American Civil War.

The Navy placed Sorrel in service as a Philadelphia tugboat, a role she maintained through the end of the Civil War and for a short period afterwards.

Service history 

W. S. Hancock—a wooden-hulled steam tug—was purchased by the Navy at Philadelphia on 1 August 1864 from Hillman and Streaker. The small steamer was renamed Sorrel and was apparently served as a general purpose tug at the Philadelphia Navy Yard throughout her naval career. She was laid up in Philadelphia in the late 1870s and remained inactive until she was sold there to A. Purvis & Son on 27 September 1883.

References 

Ships of the Union Navy
Steamships of the United States Navy
Tugs of the United States Navy
American Civil War auxiliary ships of the United States